Yann Delaigue (born April 5, 1973 in Vienne, Isère) is a retired French international rugby union player.

A highly talented player, nicknamed « Little Mozart », he played the first two matches of the 1995 Rugby World Cup. In 2001 he was part of the French Barbarians against Fiji.

In 2003, he won the Heineken Cup for Toulouse, scoring five penalties and a conversion.

He earned his first cap with the French national team on 19 March 1994 against Scotland in a Five Nations Championship match that ended in a 20-12 victory.

References

1973 births
Living people
French rugby union players
Stade Toulousain players
Rugby union fly-halves
France international rugby union players
Sportspeople from Vienne, Isère
RC Toulonnais players
Castres Olympique players